The Jackpine Lake Site, also designated 20DE326 , is an archaeological site located in Delta County, Michigan. The site dates from the Woodland period and is about 90 feet from the water. It is located near a stand of wild rice. It was listed on the National Register of Historic Places in 2014.

References

Geography of Delta County, Michigan
Archaeological sites on the National Register of Historic Places in Michigan
National Register of Historic Places in Delta County, Michigan